The 1906 Chicago Cubs season was the 35th season of the Chicago Cubs franchise, the 31st in the National League and the 14th at West Side Park. Skippered by player-manager Frank Chance, the Cubs won the National League pennant with a record of 116–36, a full 20 games ahead of the second-place New York Giants. The team's .763 winning percentage, with two ties in their 154-game season, is the highest in modern MLB history. The 2001 Seattle Mariners also won 116 games, but they did that in 162 games, resulting in a .716 winning percentage.

The 1906 Cubs are often considered the greatest MLB team to not win the World Series. In a major upset, the Cubs were beaten by their crosstown counterparts Chicago White Sox in that year's World Series.

Regular season 

Led by new manager Frank Chance, the Cubs dominated the NL. They led the league in both runs scored and fewest runs allowed by large margins. Their record of 116 wins has never been beaten, although it was tied by the 2001 Seattle Mariners (who played a longer 162-game season).

The team included four future Hall of Famers: manager and first baseman Chance, second baseman Johnny Evers, shortstop Joe Tinker, and pitcher Mordecai Brown. Brown finished second in the NL in wins to Joe McGinnity, but his 1.04 ERA set a major league record. Although the record was broken by Dutch Leonard in 1914, Brown's mark still stands as the National League record.

The pitching staff led the majors with a team earned run average of 1.76. Six members of the pitching staff had double digit victories – Mordecai Brown (26), Jack Pfiester (20), Ed Reulbach (19), Carl Lundgren (17), Orval Overall (12), and Jack Taylor (12). In addition, Mordecai Brown set a major league record with the lowest earned run average attained with at least 250 innings pitched (1.04). The offensive star was third baseman Harry Steinfeldt, who led the NL in both hits and RBI.

The team's .763 winning percentage also set a modern-era record, and was the best overall since 1885. However, it set neither a National League record nor even a franchise record, as the 19th-century White Stockings finished with better records on three occasions (1876, 1880, and 1885). The all-time major league record belongs to the 1884 St. Louis Maroons of the Union Association at .832.

On August 9, Jack Taylor threw the last of a major league record 187 consecutive complete games that he pitched (not counting appearances as a relief pitcher), a streak that began in 1901 when Taylor was pitching for the Chicago Orphans. Taylor had been re-acquired from the St. Louis Cardinals on July 1, having been traded to the Cards after the 1903 season.

Season standings

Record vs. opponents

Roster

Player stats

Batting

Starters by position 
Note: Pos = Position; G = Games played; AB = At bats; H = Hits; Avg. = Batting average; HR = Home runs; RBI = Runs batted in

Other batters 
Note: G = Games played; AB = At bats; H = Hits; Avg. = Batting average; HR = Home runs; RBI = Runs batted in

Pitching

Starting pitchers 
Note: G = Games pitched; IP = Innings pitched; W = Wins; L = Losses; ERA = Earned run average; SO = Strikeouts

Other pitchers 
Note: G = Games pitched; IP = Innings pitched; W = Wins; L = Losses; ERA = Earned run average; SO = Strikeouts

1906 World Series 

AL Chicago White Sox (4) vs NL Chicago Cubs (2)

Awards and honors 
Highest team winning percentage in one season in the modern era (.763) 
Chicago Cubs pitching staff led the majors with a team earned run average of 1.76.
Mordecai Brown, major league record, lowest earned run average with at least 250 innings pitched (1.04)

References 

1906 Chicago Cubs season at Baseball Reference

Chicago Cubs seasons
Chicago Cubs season
National League champion seasons
Chicago Cubs